A Certain Monsieur Jo (French: Un certain Monsieur Jo) is a 1958 French crime film directed by René Jolivet and starring Michel Simon, Geneviève Kervine and Jacques Morel.

The film's sets were designed by the art director Lucien Carré.

Synopsis
A former gangster now happily retired and running an inn on the banks of the river Marne, is pulled back into his former life when a pair of kidnappers bring a girl they have taken to his inn and demands he shelter them.

Cast
 Michel Simon as Joseph 'Jo' Guardini
 Geneviève Kervine as Simone Couturier
 Jacques Morel as Inspecteur Loriot
 Raymond Bussières as Louis
 Jean Degrave as Alfred Léonard
 Joëlle Fournier as Yvette Lemarchand 
 Roger Legris as L'aveugle
 Gabrielle Fontan as Mme. Michel
 Gina Manès as Lolo
 Véronique Simon as Mado
 Henri San Juan as Villequin
 Jean Daurand as Le cafetier
 Christian Brocard as Le boulanger livreur
 Jack Ary as Charlot
 Michel Salina as Commissaire Leclerc

References

Bibliography 
 Rège, Philippe. Encyclopedia of French Film Directors, Volume 1. Scarecrow Press, 2009.

External links 
 

1958 films
1958 crime films
French crime films
1950s French-language films
Films directed by René Jolivet
French black-and-white films
Films scored by Joseph Kosma
1950s French films